Miłkowo may refer to the following places:
Miłkowo, Greater Poland Voivodeship (west-central Poland)
Miłkowo, Lubusz Voivodeship (west Poland)
Miłkowo, Warmian-Masurian Voivodeship (north Poland)
Miłkowo, Drawsko County in West Pomeranian Voivodeship (north-west Poland)
Miłkowo, Szczecinek County in West Pomeranian Voivodeship (north-west Poland)

See also
Milkowo, West Pomeranian Voivodeship